(Hangul:  Gukgun) may refer to:
National Revolutionary Army
Republic of China Armed Forces
Republic of Korea Armed Forces

See also
Nationalist army  (disambiguation)